Charles R. Weaver, Jr. (born September 14, 1957) is a Minnesota politician, a former chief of staff to Minnesota Governor Tim Pawlenty, a former commissioner of the Minnesota Department of Public Safety, and a former Minnesota State Representative.

The son and nephew of former state representatives, Weaver was first elected to the House in 1989. In 1998, he ran for attorney general, losing to Mike Hatch.

In 1999, Governor Jesse Ventura appointed Weaver Commissioner of Public Safety, a position he held through 2002. In 2003, Governor Pawlenty appointed him chief of staff, a position he held for 11 months before stepping down to head the Minnesota Business Partnership, a lobbying group.

Weaver was periodically mentioned as a possible candidate to succeed Pawlenty, who did not seek a third term in office, but did not run.

Weaver is the son of former Minnesota State Representative Charlie Weaver, Sr. (1931–1992) and nephew of former State Representative John L. Weaver. He received his bachelor's degree in political science from the University of Oregon and law degree from the University of Minnesota Law School.

References

External links

Republican Party members of the Minnesota House of Representatives
State cabinet secretaries of Minnesota
Chiefs of staff to United States state governors
1957 births
Living people
University of Oregon alumni
University of Minnesota Law School alumni
People from Champlin, Minnesota